Fleet Matthis Farm was a historic home and farm complex located near Taylors Bridge, Sampson County, North Carolina.  It was built about 1830, and was a tall two-story, single pile, frame dwelling with Federal style design elements.  It had a gable roof, a full width double tier front porch, and rear shed rooms.  Also on the property are three contributing outbuildings, a cemetery, and 15 known sites of outbuildings.  It has been demolished.

It was added to the National Register of Historic Places in 1986.

References

Farms on the National Register of Historic Places in North Carolina
Federal architecture in North Carolina
Houses completed in 1830
Buildings and structures in Sampson County, North Carolina
National Register of Historic Places in Sampson County, North Carolina
1830 establishments in North Carolina